The 1975 Balkans Cup was an edition of the Balkans Cup, a football competition for representative clubs from the Balkan states. It was contested by 6 teams and Radnički Niš won the trophy.

Group A

Group B

Finals

First leg

Second leg

Radnički Niš won 3–1 on aggregate.

References

External links 

 RSSSF Archive → Balkans Cup
 
 Mehmet Çelik. "Balkan Cup". Turkish Soccer

1975
1974–75 in European football
1975–76 in European football
1974–75 in Romanian football
1975–76 in Romanian football
1974–75 in Greek football
1975–76 in Greek football
1974–75 in Bulgarian football
1975–76 in Bulgarian football
1974–75 in Turkish football
1975–76 in Turkish football
1974–75 in Yugoslav football
1975–76 in Yugoslav football
1974–75 in Albanian football
1975–76 in Albanian football